The 2006–07 Serie C1 was the twenty-ninth edition of Serie C1, the third highest league in the Italian football league system. It was divided into two phases: the regular season, played from 3 September 2006, to 13 May 2007, and the playoff phase. Once the regular season was over teams placed 2nd to 5th entered a playoff to determine the second team in each division to be promoted to Serie B. At the same time, teams placed 14th to 17th entered a playout for the right to remain in Serie C1 the following season.

As usual, Serie C1 was composed by two divisions, whose teams were divided geographically. Division C1/A was mainly composed by Northern Italy teams, whereas Division C1/B included mostly Central and Southern Italy teams. No teams from the major islands of Sardinia or Sicily took part in the 2006–07 Serie C1, as the only two eligible to participate in it, Gela and Sassari Torres, were both omitted due to financial troubles.

Teams finishing first in the regular season, plus one team winning the playoff round from each division were promoted to Serie B; teams finishing last in the regular season, plus two relegation playoff losers from each division were relegated to Serie C2.  In all, four teams were promoted to Serie B, and six teams were relegated to Serie C2.

Clubs

Serie C1/A

Serie C1/B

Final standings

Serie C1/A

Serie C1/B

Promotion and relegation playoffs

Serie C1/A

Promotion
Semi-finals
First legs played 27 May 2007; return legs played 3 June 2007

|}

Final
First leg played 10 June 2007; return leg played 17 June 2007

|}

Pisa promoted to Serie B

Relegation
Play-offs
First legs were played 27 May 2007; return were legs played 3 June 2007

|}

Ivrea and Pizzighettone relegated to Serie C2

Serie C1/B

Promotion
Semi-finals
First legs played 27 May 2007; return legs played 3 June 2007

|}

Final
First leg played 10 June 2007; return leg played 17 June 2007

|}

Avellino promoted to Serie B

Relegation
Relegation play-offs
First legs were played 27 May 2007; return legs were played 3 June 2007

|}

San Marino and Teramo relegated to Serie C2

References

External links
Italy Third Level 2006/07 at RSSSF

Serie C1 seasons
Italy
3